Kalateh-ye Lakhi Jadid (also Romanized as Kalāteh-ye Lākhī Jadīd; also known as Kalāteh-ye Lākhī) is a village in Keybar Rural District, Jolgeh Zozan District, Khaf County, Razavi Khorasan Province, Iran. At the 2006 census, its population was 275, in 61 families.

References 

Populated places in Khaf County